Björn Sieber (5 March 1989 – 26 October 2012) was an Austrian alpine skier. Sieber won two medals at the world junior championships, a silver in giant slalom in 2009, and bronze in super-G in 2008. His best World Cup result was seventh at a super-combined event in February 2011 in Bansko, Bulgaria. Sieber died in a car crash on October 26, 2012, at the age of 23.

References

1989 births
2012 deaths
Austrian male alpine skiers
Road incident deaths in Austria